The listed buildings in the town of Rotherham are included in the following lists, divided by ward:

 Listed buildings in Rotherham (Boston Castle Ward)
 Listed buildings in Rotherham (East Ward)
 Listed buildings in Rotherham (Hoober Ward)
 Listed buildings in Rotherham (Keppel Ward)
 Listed buildings in Rotherham (Sitwell Ward)
 Listed buildings in Rotherham (West Ward)
 Listed buildings in Rotherham (Wingfield Ward)

Rotherham